Sarcandra is a genus of the family Chloranthaceae, containing three species native to Asia.

Species
 Sarcandra glabra (Thunb.) Nakai	
 Sarcandra grandifolia (Miq.) Subr. & A.N.Henry	   
 Sarcandra irvingbaileyi Swamy

References

Chloranthaceae
Angiosperm genera